Francisco Antonio Cosme Bueno y Alegre (also known as Cosme Bueno; born 1711 in Belver de Cinca, Aragón, Spain; died 1798 in Lima, Peru) was a prominent Spanish-Peruvian physician and scientist in the Viceroyalty of Peru.

Works
 Disertación physico experimental sobre la naturaleza del agua, y sus propiedades. --Lima : [s.n.], [1750?].
 Colección geográfica e histórica de los arzobispados y obispados del Reyno del Perú, con las descripciones de las provincias de su jurisdicción. -- [Lima : s.n., 1759-1776].
 Catálogo histórico de los virreyes, governadores, presidentes, y capitanes generales del Perú, con los sucesos más principales de sus tiempos. -- [Lima] : [s.n.], [1763?].
 Tablas de las declinaciones del sol, calculadas al meridiano de Lima, que puedan servir sin error sensible desde el año de 1764, hasta el de 1775, inclusive. -- Lima : [s.n.], 1763.
 Inoculación de las viruelas. -- [Lima : s.n., 1778].
 Geografía del Perú virreinal. -- Lima : [D. Miranda], 1951.

References

1711 births
1798 deaths
18th-century Spanish physicians
Viceroyalty of Peru people